

School information
For the 2010–2011 school year, Alleghany High School had a total population of 442 students and 35.50 teachers on a (FTE) basis. The student population had a gender ratio of 49.5% male to 50.5% female. The demographic group makeup of the student population was: White, 85.01%; Hispanic, 11.31%; Black, 1.36%; Asian/Pacific Islander, 0.23%; and American Indian, 0.23% (two or more races, 1.81%). For the same school year, 54.07% of the students received free or reduced-cost lunches.

Athletics
According to the North Carolina High School Athletic Association, for the 2011–2012 school year, Alleghany High School is a 1A school in the Mountain Valley Conference.

The Alleghany High mascot is the Trojans, wearing the school colors of green and vegas gold. They compete in several sports throughout the school year: baseball, basketball, football, golf, tennis, volleyball, and wrestling.

State champions: 1989, 1997(2), 1998, 1999, 2002, 2006, 2007, 2008

Honors and awards
The school is ranked at a Bronze Level on the U.S. News & World Reports Best Schools report. It is ranked in the top 20 in North Carolina in that report. Also, Alleghany High was recognized as a School of Distinction in by North Carolina Department of Public Instruction for the 2009–2010 school year.

References

External links 
 

Public high schools in North Carolina
Schools in Alleghany County, North Carolina